Sminthurides is a genus of globular springtails in the family Sminthurididae. There are more than 30 described species in Sminthurides.

Species
These 32 species belong to the genus Sminthurides:

 Sminthurides annulicornis Axelson, 1905
 Sminthurides aquatica (Bourlet, 1843)
 Sminthurides aquaticus (Bourlet, 1843) (water springtail)
 Sminthurides armatus Bretfeld, 2000
 Sminthurides assimilis (Krausbauer, 1898)
 Sminthurides aureolus Maynard, 1951
 Sminthurides bifidus Mills, 1934
 Sminthurides biniserratus (Salmon, 1951)
 Sminthurides cruciatus Axelson, 1905
 Sminthurides globocerus Folsom & Mills, 1938
 Sminthurides hyogramme Pedigo, 1966
 Sminthurides inaequalis Borner, 1903
 Sminthurides inequalis
 Sminthurides lepus Mills, 1934
 Sminthurides lolelua Christiansen & Bellinger, 1992
 Sminthurides macnamarai Folsom & Mills, 1938
 Sminthurides malmgreni (Tullberg, 1877)
 Sminthurides monnioti Massoud & Betsch, 1966
 Sminthurides occultus Mills, 1934
 Sminthurides parvulus (Krausbauer, 1898)
 Sminthurides penicillifer (Schäffer, 1896)
 Sminthurides plicatus (Schott, 1891)
 Sminthurides pseudassimilis Stach, 1956
 Sminthurides pumilus (Krausbauer, 1898)
 Sminthurides ramosus (Folsom, 1922)
 Sminthurides schoetti Axelson, 1903
 Sminthurides serratus Folsom & Mills, 1938
 Sminthurides sexoculatus Betsch & Massoud, 1970
 Sminthurides stachi Jeannenot, 1955
 Sminthurides terrestris Maynard, 1951
 Sminthurides violaceus Reuter, 1881
 Sminthurides weichseli Christiansen & Bellinger, 1981

References

Further reading

External links

 

Collembola
Articles created by Qbugbot